Bruce El-mesmari Sangochian  (born 23 April 2002) is a Mexican professional footballer who plays as a winger.

Club career

Pachuca
El-mesmari joined the Pachuca youth system when he was aged 13. He went on to earn several trophies at youth level with the club, including an U-15 league championship, U-15 LIGA MX International tournament championship, U-17 league runner-up and U-20 league runner-up.

El-mesmari never made a first team appearance for Pachuca, but appeared on the bench for five Liga MX appearances in 2021.

In June 2021, it was announced that El-mesmari would opt to leave Pachuca following the expiration of his contract.

Las Vegas Lights
On 9 July 2021, El-mesmari signed with USL Championship club Las Vegas Lights. He made his professional debut on 27 July 2021, appearing as a 64th-minute substitute during a 3–1 win over Orange County SC.

International career
El-mesmari was part of the under-17 squad that participated at the 2019 CONCACAF U-17 Championship, scoring one goal, where Mexico won the competition. He also participated at the 2019 U-17 World Cup, where Mexico finished runner-up.

Personal life
Born in Cancún, Mexico, El-mesmari is of Lebanese and Armenian descent.

Career statistics

Club

Honours
Mexico U17
CONCACAF U-17 Championship: 2019
FIFA U-17 World Cup runner-up: 2019

References

2002 births
Association football midfielders
C.F. Pachuca players
Footballers from Quintana Roo
Las Vegas Lights FC players
Living people
Mexican footballers
Mexican people of Armenian descent
Mexican people of Lebanese descent
Mexico youth international footballers
Mexican expatriate footballers
USL Championship players
People from Cancún
Expatriate soccer players in the United States
Mexican expatriate sportspeople in the United States
Sportspeople of Lebanese descent